Puchberg may refer to:

 Puchberg am Schneeberg, a village in Lower Austria
 Michael von Puchberg (1741–1822, Vienna), Austrian textile merchant

See also 
 Buchberg (disambiguation)